Hannu Juhani Kamppuri (born 1 July 1957 in Helsinki, Finland) is a former professional ice hockey goaltender. Kamppuri was an accomplished SM-liiga goaltender, where he played from 1975 to 1990, and was one of the first Finnish goaltenders to compete in the National Hockey League, where he played 13 games for the New Jersey Devils during the 1984–85 season. He also appeared in net for the Edmonton Oilers of the World Hockey Association for 2 games during the 1978–79 season.

Much of his career was in the SM-liiga, with some time spent on teams in the minor professional leagues (AHL, CHL, IHL) in North America.

Kamppuri also played with the Finland men's national ice hockey team, competing at Ice Hockey World Championships and earning Bronze Medals at the 1986 and 1987 European Championships. He is a member of the Finnish Hockey Hall of Fame, being inducted in 1998.

Career statistics

Regular season and playoffs

International

Awards 
 SM-liiga, Kanada-malja (2): 1982, 1984
 SM-liiga, (2): 1981, 1987
 European Championship, (2): 1986, 1987
Urpo Ylönen trophy (best goaltender, SM-liiga) (4): (1981, 1982, 1984, 1987)
SM-liiga Lynces Academici Goalie Award (6): (1981, 1982, 1983, 1984, 1987, 1989
First Team All-Star (SM-liiga) (6): (1978, 1979, 1981, 1983, 1984, 1987)

External links 

1957 births
Living people
Baltimore Clippers (1979–81) players
Edmonton Oilers (WHA) players
Finnish ice hockey goaltenders
Fort Wayne Komets players
Houston Apollos players
Jokerit players
KooKoo players
Maine Mariners players
New Jersey Devils players
Oulun Kärpät players
Ice hockey people from Helsinki
SaiPa players
Tappara players
Undrafted National Hockey League players